Steven Butler is a comic book artist.

Steven Butler may also refer to:

Steven Butler (speedway rider) in 1991 Australian Individual Speedway Championship
Stephen Butler
Stephen Butler (rugby league) (born in 1954), Australian rugby league player with St. George

See also
Steve Butler (disambiguation)